Arnold Otto Aepli (22 August 1816, in St. Gallen – 4 December 1897) was a Swiss jurist and statesman. Aepli was president of the Swiss Council of States (1868/1869) and National Council (1876/1877).

External links 

1816 births
1897 deaths
People from St. Gallen (city)
Swiss Calvinist and Reformed Christians
Members of the Council of States (Switzerland)
Presidents of the Council of States (Switzerland)
Members of the National Council (Switzerland)
Presidents of the National Council (Switzerland)
Federal Supreme Court of Switzerland judges
Ambassadors of Switzerland to Austria-Hungary
19th-century Swiss judges